Mount Ochre is a volcanic crater, partly eroded away, lying 3 nautical miles (6 km) east of Mount Aurora on Black Island, in the Ross Archipelago. So named by the New Zealand Geological Survey Antarctic Expedition (NZGSAE) (1958–59) because reddish-brown scoria covers much of the upper slopes.

References

Volcanoes of the Ross Dependency
Black Island (Ross Archipelago)